The University of Isfahan (UI) (Persian: دانشگاه اصفهان Dāneshgāh-e Esfāhān) is a state-operated university located in Isfahan, Iran. It is ranked among the top 10 universities in Iran. The university is located on Azadi square of Isfahan. It has another campus in Khansar. University of Isfahan offers undergraduate degrees in 71 fields, graduate degrees in 185 fields and postgraduate in 119 fields.

History 
The University of Isfahan was built in 1946. The decision to establish the university was an idea developed by a number of doctors at Amin Hospital in 1939. Eventually, the board of directors of the hospital approved a plan to establish Isfahan Higher Medical Institute in 1946. In September of the same year, an ad signed by lecturer Dr. Jelveh, then caretaker of Isfahan Province Health and Medical Treatment Department, was published in local newspapers calling on prospective students to enroll in the new institute. The first classes were held at Sadi High School (now Soureh Institute). Many more students enrolled in subsequent years; therefore, the institute had to find a larger campus to accommodate the growing number of new students. The first classes took place on October 29, 1950. Medical sciences were split off into a separate school, Isfahan University of Medical Sciences, in 1985.

Faculties 
As of 2020, the university has fourteen faculties which are:
 Faculty of Administrative Sciences and Economics
 Faculty of Biological Science and Technology
 Faculty of Chemistry 
 Faculty of Civil Engineering and Transportation
 Faculty of Computer Engineering
 Faculty of Education and Psychology
 Faculty of Engineering
 Faculty of Foreign Languages
 Faculty of Geographical Sciences and Planning
 Faculty of Literature and Humanities
 Faculty of Mathematics and Statistics
 Faculty of Physics
 Faculty of Sport Sciences
 Faculty of Theology and Ahl Al-Bayt (Prophet's Descendants) Studies

Presidents

Emblem 
The university's logo was designed by Dr. Hossein Yaghini in 1968 by order of Dr. Motamedi, the president of the university.

International rankings 

CWTS Leiden Ranking:
2019: (P indicator): 765
2018: (P indicator): 776
2017: (P indicator): 797

Times Higher Education World University Rankings:
2021: 801–1,0002020: 801–1,000 2019: 801–1,000 

 Business and management: 584
 Chemistry: 692
 Engineering ranking: 598

Notable alumni 
 Nusrat Bhutto, former First Lady of Pakistan.
 Farideh Firoozbakht, a mathematician.
 Mohammad Khatami, former President of Iran.
 Ata'ollah Mohajerani, former minister of culture of Iran.
 Houshang Golshiri, Fiction writer, critic and editor
 Hrant Markarian, head of the Armenian Revolutionary Federation.
 Fatemeh Shayan, Political Scientist and winner of the 10 International Farabi Award

See also 
Higher Education in Iran
Isfahan University of Technology
Isfahan University of Medical Sciences
 Mohajer Technical University of Isfahan, Isfahan

References

External links 
 

 
University of Isfahan
Educational institutions established in 1946
1946 establishments in Iran
Buildings and structures in Isfahan